Mushegh, Moushegh or Mušeł (in Armenian Մուշեղ) is an Armenian masculine given name. Notable people with the name include:

 Moushegh Ishkhan (1914-1990), Armenian Diasporan poet, writer and educator
 Mushegh Mamikonian (disambiguation), several nobles of the Mamikonian family
 Mushegh Sarvarian, also known as Mushegh Soruri (1910-1981), Iranian film director

Armenian given names
Armenian masculine given names